85 Ceti is an older Flamsteed designation for a star that is now within the borders of the northern constellation of Aries, the ram. In the present day it is known by star catalogue designations such as HD 16861 and HR 797. It has an apparent visual magnitude of 6.30 and is approximately  distant from the Earth. This is an A-type main sequence star with a stellar classification of A2 V. It has 2.4 times the mass of the Sun and shines with 48 times the Sun's luminosity. This energy is being radiated into outer space from the star's outer atmosphere at an effective temperature of 8,810 K. This heat gives it the white-hued glow of an A-type star.

References

External links
 HR 797
 Image 85 Ceti

Ceti, 85
A-type main-sequence stars
016861
012647
0797
Durchmusterung objects